Ratan Singh was an Indian politician from the state of Madhya Pradesh.
He represented Kotma Vidhan Sabha constituency in Madhya Pradesh Legislative Assembly by winning General election of 1957.

References 

People from Madhya Pradesh
Madhya Pradesh MLAs 1957–1962
Year of birth missing
Possibly living people
People from Kotma
Indian National Congress politicians from Madhya Pradesh